Twohill is a surname. Notable people with the surname include:

David Twohill (born 1954), Australian musician
Lorraine Twohill, Irish marketer 
Pat Twohill (1915–1989), New Zealand actor and radio announcer